The women's modern pentathlon at the 2016 Summer Olympics in Rio de Janeiro was held on 19 August. Three venues were used: Deodoro Aquatics Centre (swimming), Deodoro Stadium (horse-riding and combined running and shooting) and Youth Arena (fencing).

The medals were presented by Claudia Bokel, IOC member, Germany and Klaus Schormann, President of the UIPM.

Competition format 
The sport of Modern Pentathlon consists of five disciplines. The format was slightly different from the typical Modern Pentathlon, with two events combined at the end which is now referred to as the Laser Run.[2]
 Fencing: A round-robin, one-touch épée competition. Score was based on the number of victories.
 Swimming: A 200 m freestyle race. Score was based on time.
 Riding Show Jumping: A show jumping competition. Score based on penalties for fallen bars, refusals, falls, and being over the time limit.
 Laser Run: the final Laser Run event is incredibly exciting. Athletes are seeded in order of their total points accumulated from the three previous sports. The number of seconds each athlete starts after the highest-ranked competitor is determined by their points difference. Following a short burst run to the laser targets, the athlete must complete five shots on the target's bullseye within 50 seconds. Next comes an 800-metre run. After three more Laser Run legs, the first athlete crossing the finish line wins.

Schedule 
All times are UTC-3

Results 
Thirty-six athletes participated.
Key

Records

References

Modern pentathlon at the 2016 Summer Olympics
2016 in women's sport
Women's events at the 2016 Summer Olympics